LaSalle's invariance principle (also known as the invariance principle, Barbashin-Krasovskii-LaSalle principle, or Krasovskii-LaSalle principle) is a criterion for the asymptotic stability of an autonomous (possibly nonlinear) dynamical system.

Global version 

Suppose a system is represented as

 

where  is the vector of variables, with

 

If a (see Smoothness) function  can be found such that

   for all   (negative semidefinite),

then the set of accumulation points of any trajectory is contained in  where  is the union of complete trajectories contained entirely in the set . 

If we additionally have that the function  is positive definite, i.e.

 ,   for all  
 

Furthermore, if  is radially unbounded, i.e.

 , as     

then the origin is globally asymptotically stable.

Local version 

If 
 ,   when  
 

 

does not contain any trajectories of the system besides the trajectory , then the local version of the invariance principle states that the origin is locally asymptotically stable.

Relation to Lyapunov theory 

If  is negative definite, then the global asymptotic stability of the origin is a consequence of Lyapunov's second theorem. The invariance principle gives a criterion for asymptotic stability in the case when  is only negative semidefinite.

Examples

Simple example 
Example taken from.

Consider the vector field  in the plane. The function  satisfies , and is radially unbounded, showing that the origin is globally asymptotically stable.

Pendulum with friction 
This section will apply the invariance principle to establish the local asymptotic stability of a simple system, the pendulum with friction. This system can be modeled with the differential equation

where  is the angle the pendulum makes with the vertical normal,  is the mass of the pendulum,  is the length of the pendulum,   is the friction coefficient, and g is acceleration due to gravity.

This, in turn, can be written as the system of equations

Using the invariance principle, it can be shown that all trajectories that begin in a ball of certain size around the origin  asymptotically converge to the origin. We define  as

This  is simply the scaled energy of the system. Clearly,  is positive definite in an open ball of radius  around the origin. Computing the derivative,

Observe that . If it were true that , we could conclude that every trajectory approaches the origin by Lyapunov's second theorem. However, the set

which is simply the set

does not contain any trajectory of the system, except the trivial trajectory x = 0.
As a result, the trajectory will not stay in the set .

History 
The general result was independently discovered by J.P. LaSalle (then at RIAS) and N.N. Krasovskii, who published in 1960 and 1959 respectively. While LaSalle was the first author in the West to publish the general theorem in 1960, a special case of the theorem was communicated in 1952 by Barbashin and Krasovskii, followed by a publication of the general result in 1959 by Krasovskii .

See also 

 Stability theory
 Lyapunov stability

Original papers 
 LaSalle, J.P. Some extensions of Liapunov's second method, IRE Transactions on Circuit Theory, CT-7, pp. 520–527, 1960. (PDF )
 
 Krasovskii, N. N. Problems of the Theory of Stability of Motion, (Russian), 1959. English translation: Stanford University Press, Stanford, CA, 1963.

Text books

Lectures 
 Texas A&M University notes on the invariance principle (PDF)
NC State University notes on  LaSalle's invariance principle (PDF).
Caltech notes on LaSalle's invariance principle (PDF).
MIT OpenCourseware notes on Lyapunov stability analysis and the invariance principle (PDF).
Purdue University notes on stability theory and LaSalle's invariance principle (PDF).

References 

  Lecture notes on nonlinear control, University of Notre Dame,  Instructor: Michael Lemmon, lecture 4. 
  ibid.
 Lecture notes on nonlinear analysis, National Taiwan University, Instructor: Feng-Li Lian, lecture 4-2. 
  Vidyasagar, M. Nonlinear Systems Analysis, SIAM Classics in Applied Mathematics, SIAM Press, 2002.

Stability theory
Dynamical systems
Principles